Jawid Dam (from , in ), also known as Jaweed Dam, is a dam in Kukherd city, southwestern Kukherd District, Hormozgan Province, Iran.

Geology
The Geri Konar Valley basin is located in the southern part of Zeer Mountain and southern Dasak Mountain is a beg Mount from Kukherd District in the city of Kukherd in Bastak County (شهرستان بستک) of Hormozgan Province.

Jawid Dam was named after Haji Ismaeil Jaweed.

References 

Peter Jackson and Lawrence Lockhart (Ed) (1986), Vol. 6th,  The Cambridge History of Iran: Cambridge University Press
الكوخردى ، محمد ، بن يوسف، (كُوخِرد حَاضِرَة اِسلامِيةَ عَلي ضِفافِ نَهر مِهران) الطبعة الثالثة ،دبى: سنة 199۷ للميلاد Mohammed Kookherdi (1997) Kookherd, an Islamic civil at Mehran river,  third edition: Dubai
محمدیان، کوخری، محمد ، " (به یاد کوخرد) "، ج1. ج2. چاپ اول، دبی: سال انتشار 2003 میلادی Mohammed Kookherdi Mohammadyan (2003), Beyade Kookherd, third edition : Dubai.
محمدیان، کوخردی ، محمد ،  «شهرستان بستک و بخش کوخرد»  ، ج۱. چاپ اول، دبی: سال انتشار ۲۰۰۵ میلادی Mohammed Kookherdi Mohammadyan (2005), Shahrestan Bastak & Bakhshe Kookherd, First edition : Dubai.
عباسی ، قلی، مصطفی،  «بستک وجهانگیریه»، چاپ اول، تهران : ناشر: شرکت انتشارات جهان
سلامى، بستكى، احمد.  (بستک در گذرگاه تاریخ)  ج2 چاپ اول، 1372 خورشيدى
اطلس گیتاشناسی استان‌های ایران [Atlas Gitashenasi Ostanhai Iran] (Gitashenasi Province Atlas of Iran)
محمدیان، کوخری، محمد. (کوخرد سرزمین شاعران)  ج1. چاپ اول، دبی: سال انتشار 200۵ میلادی Mohammed Kookherdi Mohammadyan (2005), Sarzamin Shaaran, First edition : Dubai.

External links 
 Kookherd website

Dams in Hormozgan Province
Reservoirs in Iran
Kukherd District
Buildings and structures in Kukherd District